Monsieur Beaucaire can refer to:

Monsieur Beaucaire (novel), a 1900 work by Booth Tarkington
Monsieur Beaucaire (operetta) based on the novel
Monsieur Beaucaire (1924 film) based on the novel starring Rudolph Valentino
Monsieur Beaucaire (1946 film) based on the novel featuring Bob Hope